Laurence Cossé (born 1950 in Boulogne-Billancourt, France) is a French writer, who published mainly novels.

She was first a journalist in the French newspaper Le Quotidien de Paris and then at the French public radio France Culture. Most of her novels were published by the French publishing house Gallimard. Her most famous novel to date, Le Coin du voile (1996), was translated as A Corner of the veil in American English (as well as in five other languages).

Although she published one poetic novel (Les Chambres du Sud) and one historical novel (La Femme du premier ministre), most of her latest novels evoke the contemporary French society, often in a critical or ironical manner. She received in 2015 the "Grand Prix de littérature" of the Académie Française.

Works 

 Novels
 Les Chambres du Sud, Gallimard, 1981
 Le Premier pas d'amante, Gallimard, 1983
 18h35 : Grand Bonheur, Le Seuil, 1991
 Un Frère, Le Seuil, 1994
 Le Coin du voile, Gallimard, 1996 (received the "Prix du Jury Jean Giono 1996"); American translation by Linda Asher:
 
 La Femme du premier ministre, Gallimard, 1998
 Le Mobilier national, Gallimard, 2001
 Le 31 du mois d'août, Gallimard, 2003; in English Accident in August (Europa Editions, 2011)
 Au bon roman, Gallimard, 2009 ; in English, A Novel Bookstore (Europa Editions, 2010)
 Les Amandes amères, Gallimard, 2011; in English, Bitter Almonds (Europa Editions, 2013)
 La Grande Arche, Gallimard, 2016 
 Short stories
 Vous n'écrivez plus ?, Gallimard, 2006 (received the "Grand Prix de la nouvelle de l'Académie Française″)
 Theater
 La Terre des Folles, published with Monseigneur de Très-Haut, HB éditions, 1995 (with illustrations by Christine Lesueur)

References

External links
 Interview by Andrei Tarkovsky in English

People from Boulogne-Billancourt
1950 births
Living people
Prix Sainte-Beuve winners
20th-century French non-fiction writers
21st-century French non-fiction writers
20th-century French women writers
21st-century French women writers